NGC 493, also occasionally referred to as PGC 4979 or GC 281, is a barred spiral galaxy in the constellation Cetus. It is located approximately 90 million light-years from Earth and was discovered on December 20, 1786 by astronomer William Herschel. It was later also observed by his son, John Herschel. John Dreyer, creator of the New General Catalogue, described the galaxy as "very faint, large, much extended 60°" with  "a little brighter middle".

See also  
 Spiral galaxy 
 List of NGC objects (1–1000)

References

External links 
 
 
 SEDS

Spiral galaxies
Pisces (constellation)
0493
4979
Astronomical objects discovered in 1786
Discoveries by William Herschel